The 2006–07 Midland Football Combination season was the 70th in the history of Midland Football Combination, a football competition in England.

Premier Division

The Premier Division featured 18 clubs which competed in the division last season, along with three new clubs:
Brereton Social, promoted from the West Midlands (Regional) League Division One
Heath Hayes, transferred from the West Midlands (Regional) League
Walsall Wood, promoted from the West Midlands (Regional) League Division One

League table

References

2006–07
10